Thanapob Leeratanakachorn  also known by his nickname Tor, is a Thai actor, model and singer. His most notable dramas and films are Hormones: The Series (2013–2014), May Who? (2015), Leh Lub Salub Rarng (2017), Project S: The Series (2017), In Family We Trust (2018), Man of Vengeance (2019) and The Last Promise (2020). He is a former member of the Thai boy group Nine by Nine.

Personal life and education  
Thanapob was born on 14 February 1994, and is the youngest child of three in a Thai Chinese family. His Chinese surname is Lee(李). He is the son of Chatchawan and Areeya Leeratanakajorn and has two brothers. He studied at Adventist Ekamai School, and graduated at Kasetsart University, with Bachelor of Science degree in Packaging Technology under Department of Packaging and Materials Technology, Faculty of Agro-Industry.

He is in a long-term relationship with Thai flight attendant Khaenapha Larpveroj (Meen).

Career 

Thanapob started his career by performing in music videos like "It's Time to Listen" by Da-Endorphine.  His debut as a television actor was in the Club Friday: The Series episode "Once in Memory." (2012).  In 2013, Thanapob joined Nadao Bangkok and was cast in the popular Thai TV show, Hormones: The Series directed by Songyos Sugmakanan, playing the role of Phai. His role in Hormones became his first notable role and gained him the popularity.

His film debut came with the mystery thriller film The Swimmers (2014) with Hormones cast members, Supassara Thanachat and Chutavuth Pattarakampol. He received the Silver Doll Award for Outstanding Male Rising Star at the 30th Surasawadee Royal Award for playing the role of Tan. He was cast for several series and films afterwards such as Club Friday: The Series (Season 5) (2014), Club Friday The Series Season 5: Secret of Classroom 6/3 (2015), Love o-net (2015), and Stupid Cupid The Series (2015). He appeared for his third film May Who? (2015) and played a main role with Sutatta Udomsilp and Thiti Mahayotaruk. He was nominated for the Best Supporting Actor Award at the 25th Suphannahong National Film Awards for playing the role of Fame.

From 2016 to 2017, Thanapob starred in several television series such as I See You, O-Negative, and The Cupid's Series: Kamathep Parbman. He also took on the role of Gym, an autistic badminton athlete in the Project S: The Series – Side by Side (2017). He received overall positive acclaim for his performance and won him the Best Actor Award at the 9th Nataraj Awards in 2018.

Thanapob debuted as one of the members of the Thai boy group Nine by Nine, a special by 4nologue and Nadao Bangkok in 2018. As an actor, Thanapob said that he struggled in dancing at first due to his minimal skills and uncomfortable feeling because of his height and limbs. As they underwent months of intensive training he felt his improvement because of his co-members' inputs and encouragement from their fans. The group has released a mini-album entitled "En-Route" and he also sang in five of the released singles of the group namely as "Night Light", "Hypnotize", "The Lucky One", "Shouldn't", and "Eternity". He also went on three tours with Nine by Nine across Thailand from 2018–2019.

He starred with his fellow Nine by Nine members in the TV series, In Family We Trust (2018), where he took on the role of Yi. He received critical acclaim and won awards such as the Best Supporting Actor Award at the 10th Nataraj Awards and Actor of the Year at the 2018 GQ Thailand Men of the Year Awards for the role.

After the Nine by Nine project, he took another lead role for television with the action drama series Man of Vengeance (2019) which aired on One 31. He won the Best Actor for Television Series Award at the 16th Komchadleuk Awards for the role of Sila/Aran. He then played in another One 31 series entitled The Last Promise (2020).

Thanapob starred in two films released in 2021 namely as One for the Road which premiered at the 2021 Sundance Film Festival as Thailand's first-ever entry to the festival and in the Netflix original film, Ghost Lab with former Nine by Nine co-member Paris Intarakomalyasut.

In 2021, he was recognized by HOWE Thailand magazine and has been included in its Top 50 Most Influential People List, for his excellence in acting and his contribution to the industry as an influencer and brand endorser.

Thanapob stayed with Nadao Bangkok as one of its actors until the company formally scaled back on its artist management operations on 1 June 2022. Since 1 July 2022, he has a personal management team, named TNPLEE.connect, tasked to manage his career and promote his works and events.

Filmography

Films

Television series

Discography

Awards and nominations

References

External links 

1994 births
Living people
Thanapob Leeratanakachorn
Thanapob Leeratanakachorn
Thanapob Leeratanakachorn
Thanapob Leeratanakachorn
Thanapob Leeratanakachorn
Thanapob Leeratanakachorn
Thanapob Leeratanakachorn
Thanapob Leeratanakachorn